Uroguanylin is a 16 amino acid peptide that is secreted by enterochromaffin cells in the duodenum and proximal small intestine. Guanylin acts as an agonist of the guanylyl cyclase receptor guanylate cyclase 2C (GC-C), and regulates electrolyte and water transport in intestinal and renal epithelia. By agonizing this guanylyl cyclase receptor, uroguanylin and guanylin cause intestinal secretion of chloride and bicarbonate to dramatically increase; this process is helped by the second messenger cGMP. Its sequence is H-Asn-Asp-Asp-Cys(1)-Glu-Leu-Cys(2)-Val-Asn-Val-Ala-Cys(1)-Thr-Gly-Cys(2)-Leu-OH.

In humans, the uroguanylin peptide is encoded by the GUCA2B gene. Uroguanylin may be involved in appetite and perceptions of 'fullness' after eating meals, as suggested by a study into mice.

See also 
 Natriuretic peptide
 Plecanatide – a medication structurally related to uroguanylin

References

External links 
 

Peptides
Digestive system